Old Hill Place Bridge is a historic bridge in Fayette, Mississippi.
The bridge, built by Schuster & Jacob, is located on Hill Road, over Coles Creek. It was listed on the National Register of Historic Places in 1979.

References

Road bridges on the National Register of Historic Places in Mississippi
National Register of Historic Places in Jefferson County, Mississippi
Suspension bridges in the United States